The Glasgow Academy is a coeducational  private day school for pupils aged 3–18 in Glasgow, Scotland. In 2016, it had the third-best Higher level exam results in Scotland. Founded in 1845, it is the oldest continuously fully private school in Glasgow.

History

The school war memorial was designed by former pupil Alexander Nisbet Paterson in 1922.

In 1981 the school admitted girl pupils for the first time.

In 1991, Glasgow Academy merged with Westbourne School for Girls, adopting the distinctive purple of its uniform in the school badge and tartan. It is located in the Kelvinbridge area and has approximately 1350 pupils, split between three preparatory school sites and a senior school.
The current rector is Matthew Pearce, who has held the position since 2019.

The Academy is one of the schools in Scotland which are Stonewall School Champions, an LGBT initiative which provides training for staff and pupils against homophobic bullying.

The Glasgow Academy’s preparatory school is the first school in the UK to have been awarded the Diana Gold Award for Anti-Bullying.

HMIe last inspected the school in November 2008.

House system
The school has a well established house system, which divides all pupils in the school into four different Houses, each represented by a School Colour:
 Arthur
 Fraser
 Morrison
 Temple

All of the houses are named after notable alumni or previous Rectors that have influenced the Academy greatly.

In the Senior School, House assemblies are normally held once a week and are run by two teachers, one male and one female, as Head of Houses.

Senior Pupils enter a wide range of activities competing in Houses. These activities include football, rugby, hockey, debating, Netball as well as an annual House singing competition and an annual Sports Day.

Notable alumni

Frederick Anderson, Chairman, Municipal Council, Shanghai International Settlement, 1905–06.
John Arthur, Church of Scotland missionary to East Africa.
J. M. Barrie, writer of Peter Pan
Laura Bartlett, British hockey international and Olympic athlete 
John Beattie (rugby player), rugby player for Scotland and British Lions
James Bridie playwright, screenwriter and physician
Jack Buchanan, actor, singer & dancer.
Sir James Caird (1864–1954), founder of the National Maritime Museum.
Sir David Young Cameron (1865–1945), Scottish painter and etcher.
Billy Campbell, winner of the 2009 Scottish BAFTA Best Fictional Film award for 'Life of a Pigeon'.
Sir John Cargill, Chairman of Burmah Oil Company, 1904–1943
Jackson Carlaw, Scottish Conservative Party MSP
Horatio Scott Carslaw (1870–1954), Professor of Pure and Applied Mathematics at the University of Sydney.
Archibald Corbett, 1st Baron Rowallan, politician and philanthropist.
Douglas Crawford, Scottish National Party MP
Pippa Crerar, Political Editor of the Daily Mirror
Darius Campbell (born Danesh), singer-songwriter & actor
Ryan Dalziel, professional racing driver
Donald Dewar, Scottish Labour Party MP and MSP, first First Minister of Scotland
Professor Ronald Drever, Professor of Physics at Caltech and part of the team that first detected gravitational waves
Andrew Dunlop, Baron Dunlop, Conservative peer
Walter Elliot, Scottish Unionist Party MP, Secretary of State for Scotland
Niall Ferguson, Professor of History at Harvard University
Alexander Forrester, cricketer and cricket administrator
George MacDonald Fraser, author 
John Gardner (law), Professor of Jurisprudence, University of Oxford
Thomas Dunlop Galbraith, 1st Baron Strathclyde, Scottish Unionist Party MP
Group Captain Sir Louis Leisler Greig, KBE, CVO  British naval surgeon, and intimate of King George VI (1880–1953)
Sir Angus Grossart, Chairman and executive director of merchant bank Noble Grossart 
Rev. Dr Andrew Harper, Scottish–Australian Biblical scholar and Principal of the Presbyterian Ladies' College, Melbourne and St Andrew's College, Sydney  (also attended Scotch College, Melbourne)
Sir Michael Hirst, Scottish Conservative and Unionist Party MP and Chairman
Sir William Wilson Hunter, KCSI CIE (1840–1900)
Andrew Innes, rhythm guitarist for Primal Scream
Andrew Innes, cricketer
Sir Jeremy Isaacs Founder of Channel 4
William Paton Ker, literary critic
John Kerr, Baron Kerr of Kinlochard, diplomat and crossbench life peer
Colin Kidd, Professor of Modern History at University of Glasgow
Alexander Dunlop Lindsay, 1st Baron Lindsay of Birker, philosopher
Maurice Lindsay CBE Scottish broadcaster, writer and poet (1918–2009).
Sir James Lithgow, shipbuilder and industrialist; 1883–1952
Neil MacGregor, Director of the British Museum
Robert Maclennan, Baron Maclennan of Rogart, leader of the Social Democratic Party and the Liberal Democrats
Alan MacNaughtan, actor
Guy McCrone, author and founding member of the Glasgow Citizens Theatre
George Matheson theologian and preacher (1842–1906)
Jim Mollison pioneer aviator (1905–1959)
W. H. Murray, mountaineer, explorer and writer
Robin Nisbet (1925–2013), professor of Latin literature
David Omand Knight Grand Cross of the Order of the Bath, former senior British civil servant, visiting professor at King's College London
Alexander Pollock, Scottish Conservative and Unionist Party MP, sheriff
James Prime, keyboard player for Deacon Blue, lecturer at the University of the West of Scotland
William Ramsay, Nobel laureate (Chemistry 1904), discovered the gas 'Argon'
John Reith, 1st Baron Reith, founder of the BBC
Albert Russell, Scottish Unionist Party MP, Solicitor General for Scotland
James Scott, obstetrician and gynaecologist
William Sharp, poet and literary biographer
Chris Simmers, professional rugby union player and Scotland rugby league international
Ninian Smart, scholar of religion
Norman Stone, historian
Euan Stubbs, cricketer
Iain Vallance, Baron Vallance of Tummel, ex-Chief Executive of BT, Liberal Democrat politician
Herbert Waddell Scottish rugby internationalist and president of the Barbarians (1902–1988)
William Walker, cricketer, cricket administrator, and British Army officer
Sir James Wordie, polar explorer and geologist

Notable alumni of Westbourne School for Girls

 Vivien Heilbron, actress
 Fiona Kennedy, singer, actress and broadcaster
 Kate Mavor, CEO of English Heritage

Bibliography
MacLeod, Iain M., The Glasgow Academy 150 Years, (The Glasgow Academicals' War Memorial Trust, 1997)

References

External links
 Official website
 The Glasgow Academy's page on Scottish Schools Online
 Profile on the Independent Schools Council website
Saturday School Ltd website.

Private schools in Glasgow
Member schools of the Headmasters' and Headmistresses' Conference
Charities based in Glasgow
Educational institutions established in 1845
Hillhead
1845 establishments in Scotland